Hüseyin Mutlu Akpınar (born April 3, 1969) is a Turkish politician and the current Mayor of Karşıyaka Municipality since 2014.

Early life and education 
Akpınar was born on April 3, 1969 in Ereğli, Konya. He had primary and secondary education in Ereğli and highschool education in Mersin. He  graduated from the Faculty of Economics and Administrative Sciences, Anadolu University. Akpınar worked as an advisor and executive in the private sector. Akpınar is currently doing a master's degree on Tax Law and Tax Law Applications at İzmir Katip Çelebi University.

Political career 
Akpınar engaged in politics by joining the Konak (İzmir) youth branch of the Republican People's Party in 1992. He took part in commissions and was a member of the district executive board between 1992 and 1995. He was elected as the head of the youth branch of Izmir city in 1996 and became a member of the Konak district executive board and deputy of the district chairman in 2000. Akpınar was elected as a delegate of the Grand Congress in 2003 and served as the city secretary at the city executive board of Izmir. In 2012 he was elected as a member of the city executive board member and served as a deputy of the city chairman, responsible for the non governmental organisations. In the local elections of 30 March 2014, Akpınar was elected Mayor of Karşıyaka from the Republican People's Party, with a record majority (%70.7) of the popular vote.

Personal life 
Akpınar is married to Zehra Akpınar and they have a daughter and a son. In his youth Akpınar played professional football. In 2013 he took part and played football in the 87 Minutes Project, organised for the successful resurrection of an historic soccer match played between F.C. Lailapas of Greece and Karşıyaka S.K. of Turkey. Akpınar is engaged to civil society and a member of the following NGOs:
 	Karşıyaka Sports Club
 	Atatürkist Thought Association (ADD)
 	Association of Social Democratic Municipalities (SODEM), Executive Board
 	Izmir Industry and Business Association (İZSİAD)
 	Izmir Platform of the Civil Society Organisations, Advisory Board (İSTOP)
 	Emergency Health For All Association (HİASD)

References

Living people
1969 births
Republican People's Party (Turkey) politicians
Mayors of places in Turkey
People from Ereğli, Konya